Kordia is a New Zealand government-owned company, offering a range of technology services and solutions to businesses. It provides a range of services, including mission-critical connectivity, cloud and cyber security services, as well as managed IT, field services, broadcast and safety of life communications.

Kordia owns and operates a network in New Zealand, which is based primarily on digital microwave technology. The company also has access to a number of fibre networks running between Auckland, Wellington and Christchurch. Part of Kordia's 65-year heritage is the nationwide network of transmission towers that was built by the company in its various iterations, including: NZBC, Television New Zealand, BCL and now Kordia. In 2007, Kordia upgraded its high sites to build the digital terrestrial television (DTT) platform, which now hosts Freeview (Free-to-air digital television in New Zealand).

In recent years, Kordia has made several acquisitions in the cyber security, cloud and managed IT space. This has enabled the company to expand specialist capability with new service offerings to its customers.

History

The New Zealand business was formed as a subsidiary of Television New Zealand Ltd (TVNZ) on 1 July 1989 as Broadcast Communications Ltd (BCL). 

In 2003 TVNZ underwent a wide restructure from a State Owned Enterprise (SOE) to a Crown Entity with a dual commercial-(public service) charter remit, with the passing of the Television New Zealand Act 2003. BCL was split from TVNZ into a separate business entity. The new entity was named Transmission Holdings Limited (THL, THL Group), with the New Zealand broadcasting business continuing to operate under the name BCL, and was, and continues to be structured as an SOE. THL took with it a significant proportion of TVNZ's debt with it, leaving the newly restructured TVNZ debt free. This high level of initial debt has impeded the business's operating performance since its inception. 

In November 2006, the business, Transmission Holdings Limited Group (BCL, THLA, AAPCS) was rebranded to Kordia. The name "Kordia" is derived from the Latin word "accordia", meaning "harmony". 

In June 2007 Kordia purchased telecommunications company and internet service provider (ISP) Orcon Limited for $27 million. In 2008 Kordia led Orcon's launch of the countries first local loop unbundled telephone and broadband services, with Orcon becoming the first New Zealand ISP to offer ADSL2+ broadband access. In April 2013 Kordia sold Orcon for an undisclosed sum to Vivid Networks, a consortium of businesspeople directed by Warren John Hurst. Less than a year later, John Hurst was facing bankruptcy and Orcon was sold to competitor Callplus in June 2014 for an undisclosed sum that was forecasted to be around $30 million.

In 2021, Kordia began licensing content from the China International Communication Center.

Current operations

Kordia operates predominantly in New Zealand, with a head office in Auckland and offices in Wellington and Christchurch.

The business operates several operations centers for its various services. This includes two Maritime Operations Centres (MOC) in Wellington and Canberra, which provide safety of life at sea communication services, a Network Operations Centre (NOC), and a Cyber Defence Operations (CDO).

Kordia operates the digital television platforms in New Zealand – digital terrestrial television (DTT) and direct-to-home (DTH-satellite), including:

TVNZ
 TVNZ 1 (and TVNZ 1+1)
 TVNZ 2 (and TVNZ 2+1)
 TVNZ Duke
Warner Bros. Discovery New Zealand
 Three (and ThreePlus1)
 Bravo (and Bravo Plus 1)
 Eden (and Eden+1)
 Rush
 HGTV
Māori Television
 Whakaata Māori
 Te Reo
Sky Television
 Sky
 Prime
Other Nationwide Stations
 Parliament TV
 Chinese TV8
 Apna Television
 Kordia TV
Regional Stations
 Channel 39

Radio Networks
 RNZ National
 RNZ Concert
 AM Network
 George FM
 Base FM

Kordia's nearly 400 high sites are available for co-location. This allows the introduction of other network operators' equipment into these strategic sites. Analogue television was switched off in 2013 as part of the move to digital TV broadcasting.

Today
Kordia competes and co-operates with other operators of physical (layer 1) telecommunication network providers such as Spark New Zealand, Vodafone New Zealand, and Transpower New Zealand Limited (the national grid operator). Kordia has trialled DVB in New Zealand and DAB in New Zealand and Australia.

Kordia owns and operates New Zealand's third largest telecommunications network – by geographical reach.

In early 2007, Kordia announced that it had signed a distribution agreement with RoamAD for the distribution of RoamAD metro Wi-Fi networks throughout New Zealand.

Kordia acquired Orcon Internet on 2 July 2007, and sold it in April 2013.

On 7 September 2007, Kordia launched Kordia Metro WiFi, an unbundled open access network of metro Wi-Fi hotzones.

In 2011, Kordia announced that it is the first company in New Zealand to achieve the Microsoft SIP Trunking qualification for Microsoft Lync.

In 2012, Kordia has launched a new data transit service from New Zealand to Asia, allowing Kiwi businesses to access the lowest latency route to Microsoft's Office 365 cloudbased productivity tools.

Main high sites

See also
 Freeview (New Zealand)

References

External links

 

Telecommunications companies of New Zealand
Government-owned companies of New Zealand
Mass media companies of New Zealand
New Zealand companies established in 2003
Telecommunications companies established in 2003
Mass media companies established in 2003
2003 establishments in New Zealand
2007 mergers and acquisitions